The Crying Light is Antony and the Johnsons' third studio album and the follow-up to the band's widely acclaimed second LP, I Am a Bird Now.
The album was released on 19 January 2009, and preceded by lead single, "Another World", released through Secretly Canadian on 7 October 2008.
The Crying Light features orchestral arrangements by Anohni and Nico Muhly.

The album was released digitally in advance of the release. Some pre-orders contained an alternate version of "Another World". Pre-orders of the physical album from Antony's official website facilitated a full album download, including bonus track "My Lord My Love", a week prior to the official release.

The album peaked in the Billboard European Top 100 at Number 1.

Antony has described the theme of the album as being "about landscape and the future."

Ann Powers wrote of The Crying Light for the LA Times online, “It's the most personal environmentalist statement possible, making an unforeseen connection between queer culture's identity politics and the green movement. As music, it's simply exquisite – more controlled and considered than anything Antony and the Johnsons have done and sure to linger in the minds of listeners."

Tours 
In anticipation of The Crying Light, Antony and the Johnsons scheduled 7 symphony concerts in 2008, including at the Barbican with the London Symphony Orchestra and at Disney Hall with the Los Angeles Philharmonic. These concerts were conducted by Jim Holmes and Rob Moose, with scores arranged by Nico Muhly.

Antony and the Johnsons toured throughout North America and Europe in support of The Crying Light between February and June 2009.

Anohni then went on to present a unique staging of "The Crying Light" in collaboration with the Manchester Camerata (conducted by Rob Moose) at the Manchester Opera House for the 2009 Manchester International Festival. The concert hall was transformed into a crystal cave constructed by Carl Robertshaw and filled with laser effects created by installation artist Chris Levine in collaboration with lighting designer Paul Normandale.

Antony and the Johnsons have gone on to present concerts with symphonies across Europe in Summer 2009, including with the Opera Orchestra of Lyon, the Metropole Orchestra, Roma Sinfonietta and the Montreux Jazz Festival Orchestra.

Artwork 
The album's cover artwork features a 1977 photograph of butoh dancer Kazuo Ohno, by Naoya Ikegami. Anohni said of the image: "The Crying Light is dedicated to the great dancer Kazuo Ohno. In performance I watched him cast a circle of light upon the stage, and step into that circle, and reveal the dreams and reveries of his heart. He seemed to dance in the eye of something mysterious and creative; with every gesture he embodied the child and the feminine divine. He's kind of like my art parent."

A music video for the single "Epilepsy Is Dancing" was produced by The Wachowskis and featured Johanna Constantine, SF choreographer Sean Dorsey and the design of painters Tino Rodríguez and Virgo Paraiso.

Track listing

Charts

Weekly charts

Year-end charts

In 2009, the album was awarded a gold certification from the Independent Music Companies Association, denoting sales in excess of 100,000 copies across Europe.

References 

Antony and the Johnsons albums
2009 albums
Secretly Canadian albums